Bahrain–Philippines relations refer to bilateral relations between Bahrain and the Philippines. The Philippines has an embassy in Manama whist Bahrain does not have a resident ambassador.

History

Formal relations between Bahrain and the Philippines was established in 1978.

State visits
The first Philippine head of state to make a state visit to Bahrain was then President Fidel V. Ramos from March 10–11, 1997. Bahraini Prime Minister Khalifa bin Salman Al Khalifa made a state visit from November 6–8, 2001. The prime minister was conferred the Order of Sikatuna with the rank Raja on November 7, 2001 during his visit. The Bahraini leader made two more visits in 2003 from February 25 to March 3 and October 29 to November 1. On December 14–15, then President Gloria Macapagal Arroyo made a state visit to Bahrain. Prime Minister Khalifa then made another working visit on April 7–13, 2005. Arroyo made another state visit on February 3–4, 2009.

Labor relations
There are about 1,500-2,000 Filipinos working as medical workers in Bahrain in 2007.
As of 2014, there are more than 67,000 Filipinos in Bahrain, some of them are workers in Bahrain.

See also
Filipinos in Bahrain

References 

 
Bilateral relations of the Philippines
Philippines